Taygetis is a genus of satyrid butterflies found in the Neotropical realm.

Taxonomy and evolution
The genus appeared as polyphyletic, with Taygetis kerea and Taygetis weymeri as part of the butterfly genus Taygetina, whereas Taygetis rectifascia and Taygetis ypthima are related to the genus Pseudodebis. Recently, the "Taygetis ypthima species group" was defined, and it includes Taygetis rectifascia, Taygetis ypthima, Taygetis drogoni, and Taygetis fulginia. However, the inclusion of such a species group within the genus Taygetis is unsupported by molecular and karyological data.

Species

Listed alphabetically:
Taygetis acuta  Weymer, 1910
Taygetis angulosa  Weymer, 1907
Taygetis asterie  Weymer, 1910
Taygetis chiquitana  Forster, 1964
Taygetis chrysogone  Doubleday, [1849]
Taygetis cleopatra  C. & R. Felder, 1862
Taygetis drogoni Siewert, Zacca, F.M.S. Dias & Freitas, 2013
Taygetis echo  (Cramer, [1775]) - echo satyr
Taygetis elegia  Weymer, 1910
Taygetis fulginia d’Almeida, 1922
Taygetis inambari  Miller & Lamas, 1999
Taygetis inconspicua  Draudt, 1931
Taygetis laches  (Fabricius, 1793)
Taygetis larua  C. & R. Felder, 1867
Taygetis leuctra  Butler, 1870
Taygetis mermeria  (Cramer, [1776])
Taygetis oyapock  Brévignon, 2007
Taygetis rectifascia  Weymer, 1907
Taygetis rufomarginata  Staudinger, 1888
Taygetis servius Weymer, 1910
Taygetis sosis  Hopffer, 1874
Taygetis sylvia  Bates, 1866
Taygetis thamyra  (Cramer, [1779])
Taygetis tripunctata  Weymer, 1907
Taygetis uncinata  Weymer, 1907
Taygetis uzza  Butler, 1869
Taygetis virgilia  (Cramer, [1776])
Taygetis ypthima  (Hübner, 1816)
Taygetis zippora  Butler, 1869

References

 , 2005: Description of new Satyrinae from French Guiana (Lepidoptera: Nymphalidae). Lambillionea CV sept.: 393-404.

Euptychiina
Nymphalidae of South America
Butterflies of Trinidad and Tobago
Butterfly genera
Taxa named by Jacob Hübner